The Shatura Power Station (or GRES-5 locally) is one of the oldest power stations in Russia. The facility is located in Shatura, Moscow Oblast, and generates power by utilizing two 210 MW units, three 200 MW units, and one 80 MW unit, for a total capacity of 1.1 GW. Built in 1925, the power station initially used peat as its fuel source. Later on, the power plant has been diversified into multifuel. In 2010, a new combined cycle block of 400 MW was installed. The 80 and 400 MW blocks can not work on peat.

Balance of fuel
In 2005 the fuel use was:
 Natural gas: 78%
 Peat: 11.5%
 Fuel oil: 6.8%
 Coal: 3.7%

See also 

 List of fuel oil power stations
 List of largest power stations in the world
 List of power stations in Russia

References 

Natural gas-fired power stations in Russia
Coal-fired power stations in Russia
Oil-fired power stations in Russia
Peat-fired power stations in Russia
Buildings and structures in Moscow Oblast
Power stations built in the Soviet Union
1925 establishments in the Soviet Union